The name Zeke has been used for three tropical cyclones in the Northern Hemisphere, one in the Eastern Pacific and two in the Western Pacific.

Eastern Pacific:
 Tropical Storm Zeke (1992) – stayed off shore of southwestern Mexican coast

Western Pacific:
 Typhoon Zeke (1991) (T9106, 06W, Etang) – passed over the Philippines before hitting Hainan
 Typhoon Zeke (1994) (T9408, 12W) – stayed well east of Japan

Pacific hurricane set index articles
Pacific typhoon set index articles